Dasht Kuh-e Anjirak (also Romanized as Dasht Kūh-e Ānjīrak) is a village in Kahnuk Rural District, Irandegan District, Khash County, Sistan and Baluchestan Province, Iran. At the 2006 census, its population was 18, in 4 families.

References 

Populated places in Khash County